Everlane is an American clothing retailer that sells primarily online. The organization is headquartered in San Francisco, California and also has stores in New York City, Boston, Los Angeles, Austin, and Palo Alto. The company was founded with the mission of selling clothing  with transparent pricing.

History 
Everlane was founded in 2010 by Michael Preysman and Jesse Farmer as a direct-to-consumer online menswear retailer.  Preysman and Farmer collaborated with Andy Zhang for the sourcing of ethical materials. The company enables customers to see how much each item costs to produce and how big the company's mark up is. Everlane started with a referral invite list that gained 60,000 subscribers in five days, although the company only had 1,500 T-shirts in inventory.

In 2014, Everlane began a partnership with delivery company Postmates to provide same-day delivery to consumers in San Francisco and New York. The company opened permanent stores in SoHo in New York City in 2017 and in San Francisco in 2018.

Products and sales 
On its website Everlane attempts to educate customers on its supply chain, factories, employees, and the price breakdown of each product.

In 2018, the company pledged to stop using virgin plastic by 2021, including in packaging and in clothing made of synthetic fibers. On October 24, 2018, Everlane launched ReNew, a line of outerwear crafted from materials that were created out of 3 million recycled plastic bottles. The company plans to accomplish their goal by redeveloping the fabrics, yarns, and all raw materials that contain synthetic fibres into recycled components by 2021. In May 2019, Everlane released the DayGlove ReKnit, a shoe made entirely of recycled plastic bottles.

Everlane holds "Choose What You Pay" sales, which allow shoppers to select one of three prices for a piece of merchandise. The lowest price covers production and shipping cost, while the higher prices cover additional costs such as overhead. Preysman, CEO of Everlane, explained the sale as an attempt to make the brand more transparent.

Anti-union activity
In late December 2019, Everlane employees (most of them in the Customer Experience Department) attempted to form a union under the auspices of the Communications Workers of America. In March 2020 union members asked to be officially recognized by the company. On March 27, 2020, the union group's Twitter account (@EverlaneU) tweeted, "Nearly every member of our team was just laid off. Retail workers from Everlane stores are being trained to replace us to answer your support emails. We are devastated beyond measure." Forty-two out of 57 of the remote customer experience department had been laid off in addition to 180 part-time retail employees, while 68 full-time retail employees were informed they were furloughed. The layoffs were apparently surprising as employees had reportedly been reassured that business was strong. Everlane has since been receiving backlash, most notably from Senator Bernie Sanders, who wrote on his Twitter account "Using this health and economic crisis to union bust is morally unacceptable."

Awards and honors
In 2015, founder Michael Preysman was included in Forbes' 30 Under 30 for his work on the firm in "reinventing retail and E-Commerce." Preysman has also been included in the BoF 500, an index of the people shaping the contemporary fashion industry.

References

External links
 Official website

2010s fashion
Social enterprises
Companies based in San Francisco
2010 establishments in California
Online clothing retailers of the United States
American companies established in 2010